Viroflay-Rive-Droite station (French: Gare de Viroflay-Rive-Droite) is a railway station in the commune of Viroflay (department of Yvelines). It is in the Île-de-France region of France and is part of the Transilien rail network, on the Paris-Saint-Lazare – Versailles-Rive-Droite line. It is also an underground tram-on-tyres stop on line 6.

The name "Rive-Droite" refers to the trains' Paris destination (Saint-Lazare) being on the right bank of the Seine.

The Transilien & tramway platforms are connected by an IMEM Ascenseurs lift.

References

External links
 

Railway stations in Yvelines
Railway stations in France opened in 1840